Alliford Bay Water Aerodrome  is located on Alliford Bay, British Columbia, Canada. Alliford Bay is a part of Skidegate Inlet, Moresby Island in the Haida Gwaii Islands.

See also
Sandspit Airport

References

Seaplane bases in British Columbia
Airports in Haida Gwaii
North Coast Regional District
Registered aerodromes in British Columbia